Karl Georg Harald Schenstrøm (13 November 1881 – 10 April 1942) was a Danish stage and film actor of the silent era in Denmark. He worked under directors such as August Blom and Lau Lauritzen Sr.

Together with Harald Madsen, Schenstrøm formed the Danish comedian couple Fyrtårnet og Bivognen (Fy og Bi), known as "Long & Short" in England and "Ole & Axel" in the U.S.

Selected filmography

Den hvide Slavehandels sidste Offer (1911) - Count X
Mormonens offer (English:A Victim of the Mormons) (1911) - Larssons Mormon Friend
Vampyrdanserinden (1912)
Historien om en moder (1912)
Bøffen og bananen (1913)
Kæmpedamens bortførelse (1913)
Chatollets Hemmelighed (1913)
Atlantis (1913)
Elskovsleg (1914) - Doden
I kammerherrens klæder (1914)
Millionærdrengen (1914) - Prof. Sihm
Midnatssolen (1914) - Miner
Helvedesmaskinen (1914)
Herberg for Hjemløse (1914, Short)
Detektivens barnepige (1914) - Count von Warden
Uden Fædreland (1914)
Den kulørte Slavehandler (1914) - Prins Gera
De besejrede Pebersvende (1914) - Spill
Bytte Roller (1914)
Evangeliemandens liv (1915)
Skorstensfejeren kommer i morgen (1915)
Det blaa vidunder (1915)
Familien Pille som Spejdere (1915, Short) - Gert Pille
En slem Dreng (1915, Short)
Kong Bukseløs (English release title: His New Grey Trousers) (1915, Short) - Adam Brink - Actor
Kampen om barnet (1915) - Pub Guest
Den hvide djævel (1916)
Gar el Hama IV (1916)
Værelse Nr. 17 (1916)
Filmens Datter (1916)
Hjerteknuseren (1918) - Theobald Smit
Mästerkatten i stövlar (1918) - En man på festen
Brændt a (1919)
Hans store Chance (1919)
Krigsmillionæren (1919)
Manden der gøer (1919) - Bønne
Towards the Light (1919) - Djævelen
Hvorledes jeg kom til Filmen (1919)
Hendes mands forlovede (1919)
Gudernes yndling (1920)
De nygifte (1920)
Silkesstrumpan (1921) - Alfred
Ungkarleliv (1921) - Knast - Bachelor
Vor fælles Ven (1921)

Ole & Axel Films

Film, flirt og forlovelse (1921) - Fyrtaarnet
Landliggeridyl - Vandgang (1921) - Fyrtaarnet
Sol, sommer og studiner (1922) - Fyrtaarnet
Han, hun og Hamlet (1922) - Fyrtaarnet
Kan Kærlighed kureres? (1923) - Long
Vore venners vinter (1923) - Fyrtaarnet
Daarskab, dyd og driverter (1923) - Fyrtaarnet
Mellem muntre musikanter (1923) - Fyrtaarnet
Lille Lise let-paa-taa (1923) - Fyrtaarnet
Blandt byens børn (1923) - Fyrtaarnet
Professor Petersens Plejebørn (1924) - Long
Raske Riviera Rejsende (1924) - Fy
Ole Opfinders offer (1924) - Fyrtaarnet
The Last Laugh (1924) - Wedding Musician (uncredited)
Takt, tone og tosser (1925) - Fy
Polis Paulus' påskasmäll (1925) - Lunken
Vagabonder i Wien (1925)
Grønkøbings glade gavtyve (1925) - Fy
Ulvejægerne (1926) - Fy
Dødsbokseren (1926) - Fy
Sons in Law (1926)
Ebberöds bank (1926) - Tadeus, Bankangestellter
Lykkehjulet (1926) - Fy
Don Quixote (1926) - Don Quixote
Kraft og skønhed (1927) - Fy
Vester Vov-Vov (1927) - Fy
Tordenstenene (1927) - Fy
Kongen af Pelikanien (1928) - Fy
Filmens helte (1928) - Fyrtaarnet 'Paf'
Cocktails (1928) - Gin
Kys, klap og kommers (1929) - Fyr
Hallo! Afrika forude! (1929) - Fyrtaarnet
Alf's Carpet (1929) - Bill
Højt paa en kvist (1929) - Fyrtaarnet
Hr. Tell og Søn (1930) - Fyrtaarnet
1000 Worte deutsch (1930) - Fy
Pas paa pigerne''' (1930) - FyI kantonnement (1931) - FyrtaarnetKrudt med knald (1931) - FyLumpenkavaliere (1932) - PatHan, hun og Hamlet (1932) - FyrtaarnetMed fuld musik (1933) - FyrtaarnetCircus Saran (1935) - ClownMädchenräuber (1936) - PatBlinde Passagiere (1936) - Pat, blinder Passagier
 The Pale Count (1937) - FyrtornetPat und Patachon im Paradies (1937) - PatMidt i byens hjerte (1938)I de gode, gamle dage'' (1940) - Fyrtaarnet / Pat (final film role)

References

External links

Carl Schenstrøm at the Danish Film Institute
Photographs and literature

Danish male actors
Danish male stage actors
Danish male film actors
Danish male silent film actors
20th-century Danish male actors
1881 births
1942 deaths
Place of death missing